Phrachomklao Hospital, sometimes stylised King Mongkut Memorial Hospital, is the main hospital of Phetchaburi Province, Thailand. It is classified under the Ministry of Public Health as a general hospital.

History 
Initially, when King Mongkut constructed the Phra Nakhon Khiri palace in 1861, he allowed a small missionary team to set up within the town below the palace. The first hospital operated by the missionaries opened in 1880 near Wat Noi and operated until 1934. In 1929, the Thai Red Cross Society set up a small health station which remained as the only health station that served Phetchaburi between 1934 to 1951. It still operates as The Red Cross Health Station 8 today. 

The current hospital began construction in 1948 and was named Phetchaburi Hospital. It was opened on 10 March 1951. It was renamed Phrachomklao Hospital on 2 March 1989 in commemoration of King Mongkut. It is currently a general hospital with a capacity of 447 inpatient beds as of 2022.

See also 

 Healthcare in Thailand
 Hospitals in Thailand
 List of hospitals in Thailand

References 

 Article incorporates material from the corresponding article in the Thai wikipedia.

Hospitals in Thailand
Phetchaburi province